Börje Strandvall (22 January 1909 – 20 July 1987) was a Finnish sprinter. He competed in the men's 200 metres at the 1936 Summer Olympics.

References

External links
 

1909 births
1987 deaths
Athletes (track and field) at the 1932 Summer Olympics
Athletes (track and field) at the 1936 Summer Olympics
Finnish male sprinters
Olympic athletes of Finland
Place of birth missing